Eduard Ham (born 14 May 1950) is a Dutch fencer. He competed in the individual sabre event at the 1972 Summer Olympics.

References

External links
 

1950 births
Living people
Dutch male sabre fencers
Olympic fencers of the Netherlands
Fencers at the 1972 Summer Olympics
Sportspeople from Delft
20th-century Dutch people